Hote may refer to:

 Hote language
Hote, Indonesia, a village on Seram Island